The men's discus throw event at the 1959 Pan American Games was held at the Soldier Field in Chicago on 31 August.

Results

References

Athletics at the 1959 Pan American Games
1959